Agnieszka Radwańska was the defending champion, but lost in the semifinals to Caroline Wozniacki. 

Wozniacki went on to win the final, defeating Vera Dushevina, dropping just two games to claim the first title of her career.

Seeds

Draw

Finals

Top half

Bottom half

External links 
Draw and Qualifying Draw

Singles 2008
Nordea Nordic Light Open
Nordic